The Ligue 2 season 2002–03, organised by the LFP was won by Toulouse FC and saw the promotions of Toulouse FC, Le Mans UC72 and FC Metz, whereas AS Beauvais, ES Wasquehal and Stade de Reims were relegated to National.

20 participating teams

 Amiens
 Beauvais
 Caen
 Châteauroux
 Clermont
 Créteil
 Grenoble
 Gueugnon
 Istres
 Laval
 Le Mans
 Lorient
 Metz
 Nancy
 Niort
 Reims
 Saint-Étienne
 Toulouse
 Valence
 Wasquehal

League table

Results

Top goalscorers

External links
RSSSF archives of results
Official attendance on LFP site

Ligue 2 seasons
French
2002–03 in French football